Raccordo autostradale 12 (RA 12) also called asse attrezzato or raccordo Chieti-Pescara, is a motorway located in the region of  Abruzzo, and has been included in the itinerary of the European route E80; performs the function of east-west ring road of Pescara connecting it to the motorways A14 and A25 motorways.

References 

RA12
Transport in Abruzzo